Lynn Stewart may refer to:

 Lynn D. Stewart (businessman) (born 1943), co-founder of Hooters
 Lynn D. Stewart (politician) (born 1941), American politician 
 Lynn Stewart (Black Lightning), a fictional character

See also
 The True Story of Lynn Stuart, a 1958 American biographical crime drama film
 Lynne Stewart (1939–2017), American defense attorney 
 Lynne Marie Stewart (born 1946), American actress